Bishop John Cantwell was a Roman Catholic Bishop of Meath.

John Cantwell was born in Rahan, near Tullamore, Co. Offaly on Christmas Day 1792, to Edward Cantwell (1750–1831) and his wife Catherine Flynn (1760–1842). He went to Maynooth College to study for the priesthood at a very early age. At Maynooth he excelled as a student, and was one of the first Dunboyne Establishment students, going on to hold the chair of Natural Philosophy	 at the College. He was appointed Dean of the Ecclesiastical College, before being ordained a priest ages 22 in 1815. He served as parish priest of Kilbeggan, Co. Westmeath, and in 1830 he was called upon to become Bishop of Meath.

Bishop Cantwell encouraged the building of schools and churches in the diocese, and the presences of religious orders.

Dr. Cantwell died at his bishops residence in Mullingar, Co. Longford, in December 1866 and is interred in Mullingar Cathedral.

References

People from County Offaly
1792 births
1866 deaths
Roman Catholic bishops of Meath
Alumni of St Patrick's College, Maynooth